Rudy del Rosario (15 September 1969 – 20 November 2020) was a Filipino football coach and footballer who played for the Philippines national football team and Kaya F.C.

College career
Del Rosario played for the football team of the University of the Philippines.

Club career
Kaya F.C., which now plays in the Philippines Football League, was established in 1996 by del Rosario along with Bob Kovacs and John Rey Bela-Ong. He was also served as a player with the club.

International career
Del Rosario played for the Philippines national football team and was captain from 1994 to 1997. He was part of the Philippine squad for the 1991 Southeast Asian Games. which won 1–0 against Malaysia, which was considered as an upset at the time. In the 1994 Philippine Cup, a tournament held at the Rizal Memorial Club which the national team won, del Rosario was part of the squad that defeated South China A.A., Taipei Tigers and a Xiamen provincial selection. He also came out of retirement to play for the national futsal team at the 2001 AFF Futsal Championship.

Coaching career
After his retirement, del Rosario served as head coach of Kaya F.C. In 2010, he was became the long-time coach of the Philippine squad which participated in the Homeless World Cup.

Death
Del Rosario died on November 20, 2020, after slipping and had a bad fall the day before.

References

External links
 

1969 births
2020 deaths
Filipino footballers
Filipino men's futsal players
Philippines international footballers
Association football forwards
Kaya F.C. players
Polytechnic University of the Philippines alumni
Filipino football head coaches